The Robert Schalkenbach Foundation is a private operating foundation dedicated to the social and economic philosophy of Henry George.

History 
The organization was founded in 1925 to promote public awareness of the social and economic philosophy of Henry George.  It is the oldest Georgist organization in existence.

Activities 
The Foundation, in partnership with Wiley Publishing, sponsors The American Journal of Economics and Sociology.

Leadership 
The organization's executive director is Josie Faass.  Past directors have included economists Mason Gaffney and Nicolaus Tideman.

Funding 
 the foundation receives grants from the Francis Neilson Trust Fund. It holds approximately $18 million in assets.

Publications

Books 
 Progress and Poverty by Henry George
 Social Statics, or The Conditions essential to Happiness specified, and the First of them Developed by Herbert Spencer
 Land title origins, a tale of force and fraud by Alfred Noblit Chandler
 Protection or Free Trade by Henry George
 Crumbling Foundations: how faulty institutions create world poverty by David Smiley
 Rent as Public Revenue: Issues and Methods by Lindy Davies, Gilbert Herman, et al.
 Democracy Versus Socialism: A Critical Examination of Socialism as a Remedy for Social Injustice and an Exposition of the Single Tax Doctrine by Max Hirsch
 Why Global Poverty?: A Companion Guide to the Film The End of Poverty? by Clifford Cobb
 New Life In Old Cities by Mason Gaffney
 The Science of Political Economy by Henry George

Journals 
 Sponsor of The American Journal of Economics and Sociology

Film 
The End of Poverty?

External links

References 

Georgist organizations
Organizations established in 1925